Mohammed Ali Omar Sagaf (born 12 November 1997) is a Somali professional footballer who plays for National League side Dagenham & Redbridge.

Career
Sagaf began his career in the youth team before joining the youth team at Real Avilés in February 2015 along with team-mate and compatriot Salim Nassor. He began his senior career in August that year at North Greenford United, where he played in four FA Cup games at the start of the 2015–16 season. In September 2015, Sagaf, along with Nassor, travelled to Italy and joined the academy at Ternana, where he played for the under-19 team in Campionato Primavera. Sagaf returned to England and played for Leatherhead in the 2016–17 season, before joining Waltham Forest for 2017–18, where he scored 10 goals in 23 games and was made captain.

In January 2018, Sagaf joined Ipswich Town, where he played for the under-23 team. After a brief spell with Barking at the start of the 2018–19 season, Sagaf joined Braintree Town in September 2018. He won the National League player of the month in April 2019 after three goals in five games that month. After a trial with FK Sarajevo the following month, Sagaf returned to England and signed a one-year deal with Carlisle United after a successful trial. He scored on his League Two debut as a substitute against Swindon Town on 10 August 2019. Sagaf was released at the end of the season. On 30 January 2021, Sagaf signed for National League side Dagenham & Redbridge.

Career statistics

References

External links
 
 Mohammed Sagaf at Aylesbury United

1997 births
Living people
English footballers
Somalian footballers
English sportspeople of African descent
English people of Somali descent
People from Kismayo
Association football midfielders
Real Avilés CF footballers
North Greenford United F.C. players
Ternana Calcio players
Leatherhead F.C. players
Walthamstow F.C. players
Ipswich Town F.C. players
Barking F.C. players
Braintree Town F.C. players
Carlisle United F.C. players
Dagenham & Redbridge F.C. players
English Football League players
National League (English football) players
Isthmian League players
English expatriate footballers
Expatriate footballers in Spain
Expatriate footballers in Italy